Norman Wilfred Lewis (July 23, 1909 – August 27, 1979) was an American painter, scholar, and teacher. Lewis, who was African-American and of Bermudian descent, was associated with abstract expressionism, and used representational strategies to focus on black urban life and his community's struggles.

Early life and education 
Norman Wilfred Lewis was born on July 23, 1909 in the Harlem neighborhood in New York City, New York. He was raised on 133rd Street, between 7th and 8th Avenues. Both of his parents were from Bermuda, his father Wilfred Lewis, was a fisherman and later a dock foreman and his mother Diane Lewis, was a bakery owner and later a domestic worker. He had two brothers and Norman was the middle child, his eldest brother Saul Lewis became violinist, later playing jazz music with notable musicians such as Count Basie and Chick Webb. Lewis attended Public School No. 5, which at the time was a primarily white student population. He was always interested in art, but he did not express it in early childhood due to a lack of resources and of being overshadowed by his older brother with musical talent.

As a young man, he started studying art through self education and he amassed a few commercial art books, initially practicing drawing from them. Often he would get frustrated by the level of detail he could not achieve when compared to the commercial art, unaware that he was copying the art at a different scale than they were produced. He later started studying art history books with more success. Self education of art got him started in his career but it later complicated his relationship with teachers and other students, and he struggled with full understanding of some of the lessons.

A lifelong resident of Harlem, starting around age 20 he also traveled extensively. For three years he worked on ocean freighters, and as a seaman he traveled to South America and the Caribbean.

When he returned from sea, he got a job as a textile and garment presser in a tailor's studio and it was there he met artist Augusta Savage, whose art studio was in the basement of the tailors shop. He studied art with Augusta Savage at the Savage Studio of Arts and Crafts in Harlem. Savage was an important early influence who provided him with open studio space at her Harlem Community Art Center. Lewis was a member of 306 Group in 1934, a collection of African American artists and writers who discussed art's role in society. Some well-known members were Augusta Savage, Romare Bearden, Ralph Ellison, Jacob Lawrence, and Richard Wright, as well as Charles Alston, who hosted the meetings in his studio. In 1935, he was a co-founder of the Harlem Artists Guild, whose members included Romare Bearden, Selma Burke, and Beauford and Joseph Delaney.

Between 1933–1935, he studied at Teachers College, Columbia University and at the John Reed Club Art School.

He also participated in Works Progress Administration as an art teacher starting in 1935, alongside Jackson Pollock, among others. One of the places he worked at during his time in the WPA was the Harlem Community Art Center.

After Works Progress Administration came to an end in 1943, Lewis found a job teaching at the newly established George Washington Carver School, a community school for students from low-income families in Harlem, where his colleagues included artists Elizabeth Catlett and Charles White, among others. From 1944 to 1949, he taught art at the Thomas Jefferson School of Social Science.

Social realism and figurative work 
Lewis began his career in 1930, with earlier mostly figurative work and social realism. He at first painted what he saw, which ranged from Meeting Place (1930), a swap meet scene, and The Yellow Hat (1936), a formal Cubist painting, to Dispossessed (1940), an eviction scene, and Jazz Musicians (1948), a visual depiction of the bebop music that was being played in Harlem. His social realism was painted with "an overtly figurative style, depicting bread lines, evictions, and police brutality."

Lewis said he struggled to express social conflict in his art, but in his later years, focused on the inherently aesthetic. "The goal of the artist must be aesthetic development," he told art historian Kellie Jones, "and in a universal sense, to make in his own way some contribution to culture."

Abstraction 

In the late 1940s, his work became increasingly abstract. His total engagement with abstract expressionism was due partially to his disillusionment with America after his wartime experiences in World War II. It seemed extremely hypocritical that America was fighting "against an enemy whose master race ideology was echoed at home by the fact of a segregated armed forces." Seeing that art does not have the power to change the political state that society was in, he decided that people should develop their aesthetic skills more, instead of focusing on political art. Tenement I (1952), Harlem Turns White (1955), and Night Walker No. 2 (1956) are all examples of his style.  Twilight Sounds (1947) and Jazz Band (1948) are examples of his interest in conveying music.

One of his best known paintings, Migrating Birds (1953), won the Popular Prize at the Carnegie Museum's 1955 Carnegie International Exhibition, the New York Herald-Tribune calling the painting "one of the most significant of all events of the 1955 art year." His signature style in those decades included repetitive ideographic or hieroglyphic elements that allowed Lewis to incorporate narrative sequences into his paintings.

He became interested in the Abstract Expressionist movement and began attending meetings at Studio 35 with The Irascibles, at a loft at 35 East Eighth Street, Manhattan. He was the only African-American in attendance and it was through these meetings he met David Smith, Ad Reinhardt, Mark Tobey, and Richard Lippold. However Lewis did not fully embrace the Abstract Expressionist movement because "it did not favor all artists equally", and he was struggling with attaining collectors and museums despite his awards and prestigious exhibition history. Norman Lewis was the only African-American artist among the first generation of abstract expressionists, but his work was overlooked by both White and African-American art dealers and gallery owners.

In his last 20 years, Lewis created and developed his very own unique blending of abstraction and figuration. His rhythmic lines and shapes now hinted at figures moving through his layers of colours. “Untitled” (ca. 1957) shows Lewis’s transition from pure abstraction towards this new approach, that blends abstraction with figuration.

Spiral artist group (1963 to 1965) 
Lewis was a founding member of Spiral, a group of artists and writers who met regularly between 1963 to 1965, that included Charles Alston, Romare Bearden, and Hale Woodruff. The group met "to discuss the potential of Black artists to engage with issues of racial equality and struggle in the 1960s through their work." The Spiral group disbanded in 1965, as a result of discrimination of the group, and Lewis felt that protesting was a better way to bring attention and deal with the social issues than painting was.

Despite Spiral's short existence, it was very impactful in the art world, as it called attention to many issues of racial inequality that existed at the time. For instance, due to Spiral and other groups' continuous protest against the 1968 controversial exhibit "Harlem on My Mind" in the Metropolitan Museum of Art, Black people became more visible in the art world. Before this exhibition, the Met did not feature anything on New York's cultural powerhouse neighborhood Harlem. Harlem is known for its art and music, but this exhibition featured no self-representation of that from the neighborhood and instead, it was composed of photographs that a non-Harlemite photographer took of the people who lived there.

Later work 
In 1969, Lewis founded the Cinque Gallery in New York City along with Romare Bearden and Ernest Crichlow. During the same year, he protested in front of Metropolitan Museum of Art because of the highly controversial exhibition, Harlem On My Mind.

His later work includes Alabama II (1969), Part Vision (1971), and New World Acoming (1971), as well as a series called Seachange done in his last years.

From 1965-1971, he taught art for the Harlem Youth in Action program. He started teaching at the Art Students League of New York starting in 1972, and work there until his death in 1979.

Death and legacy 
In 1975, he married his long-time girlfriend, Ouida Bramwell. He never had any children of his own, but he was a father figure to Tarin Fuller, the daughter of Bramwell.

He died unexpectedly on August 27, 1979 at the age of 70, in New York City.

His body of work included paintings, drawings, and murals. Although he was represented by Willard Gallery, his only gallery representation, and he was the recipient of many awards and good reviews, his work did not sell nearly as well as the other Abstract Expressionists he exhibited with such as Mark Tobey or Mark Rothko. He was not included in important publications for Abstract Expressionism of the time, including The Triumph of American Painting: A History of Abstract Expressionism (1970) and The New York School: The Painters and Sculptors of the Fifties (1978) by Irving Sandler and never mentioned in the writings by Dore Ashton.

Exhibitions and collections 
Lewis' first major exhibition was in 1934 at the Metropolitan Museum of Art, where he received an honorable mention for his painting titled The Wanderer (Johnny). In 1946, he was accepted into the Marian Willard Gallery located in New York, which is where he had his first solo exhibition 3 years later.

Lewis had art shows in 1951 at the Museum of Modern Art and in 1958, at the Whitney Museum of American Art.

The first retrospective of his life's work was displayed at the City University of New York Graduate Center in 1976. The exhibition Black Paintings, 1946-1977 at the Studio Museum in Harlem in 1998 was dedicated to his paintings that centered around the color black. Another solo exhibition was Norman Lewis, from the Harlem Renaissance to Abstraction in the Kenkeleba Gallery in New York in 1989.

"From the Margins: Lee Krasner and Norman Lewis, 1945-1952" in 2014 and "Procession: the Art of Norman Lewis" at the Pennsylvania Academy of Fine Arts in 2015 attempted to give him and the other black artists credit for their involvement in the abstract expressionism movement that they didn't receive while living.

His work is included in many public museum collections including Museum of Modern Art (MoMA), Smithsonian American Art Museum, the Metropolitan Museum of Art, the Art Institute of Chicago, Blanton Museum of Art, High Museum of Art, among others.

Awards 
For the Congress of Industrial Organization in 1943, he won a competition by designing a war relief poster. At the Pittsburgh International Exhibition at the Carnegie Institute in 1955, his painting Migrating Birds (1953) was awarded the Popularity Prize by visitors.

In 1972, he received a grant from the Mark Rothko Foundation and a Fellowship from the National Endowment for the Arts (NEA). In 1975, he received a Guggenheim Fellowship for painting.

Bibliography 
Listed by ascending date:

Art portfolios

Art exhibition catalogues 

 
 "Norman W. Lewis, The Second Transition: 1947-1951", 1994, Bill Hodges Gallery

Art history books

See also 
 List of Federal Art Project artists

References

External links 

 Video: Procession: The Art of Norman Lewis (2016) with Ruth Fine, curator at the National Gallery of Art

1909 births
1979 deaths
Painters from New York City
20th-century American painters
American male painters
Modern painters
Abstract expressionist artists
People from Harlem
Artists from New York (state)
American people of Bermudian descent
National Endowment for the Arts Fellows
Federal Art Project artists
Art Students League of New York faculty
Teachers College, Columbia University alumni
20th-century African-American painters
20th-century American male artists